Thalassotalea eurytherma  is a  Gram-negative, aerobic and rod-shaped bacterium from the genus of Thalassotalea which has been isolated from seawater from the East China Sea.

References

 

Alteromonadales
Bacteria described in 2015